The Dreaming Man  is a 2017 Chinese romantic comedy film starring Chen Bolin, Lin Yun and Zhang Yunlong. It is a remake of While You Were Sleeping.

It is the first Chinese film produced by The Walt Disney Studios. The film was released on December 8, 2017.

Synopsis
Wang Xiaohe (portrayed by Lin Yun)'s parents died early, leaving her to live alone in a big city. She fell in love with the talented Zheng Tianle (portrayed by Zhang Yunlong) and was mistaken as his fiancee by his older brother Zheng Tianchou (portrayed by Chen Bolin) because of a diamond ring. How will the three of them resolve these conflicts?

Cast
Chen Bolin as Zheng Tianchou
Lin Yun as Wang Xiaohe 
Zhang Yunlong as Zheng Tianle 
Phil Chang as Uncle
Paul Chun as Father
Jiang Hongbo as Mother
Chung Hsin-ling as Aunt
Chen Qi as Grandmother
Chen Si

Production
The Dreaming Man is the first live-action theatrical release that is part of the multi-picture development deal between Wudi Pictures Corp and Walt Disney Studios. The film is co-produced by Shanghai Media Group, Walt Disney Studios and Shanghai Artrendwave Productions.

Soundtrack

References

External links

2017 films
Chinese romantic comedy films
Walt Disney Pictures films
2010s Mandarin-language films